Cor Varkevisser (born 14 May 1982 in Leiden) is a Dutch footballer who plays for Quick Boys in the Dutch Derde Divisie.

Club career
Varkevisser came through the youth ranks at Feyenoord but moved to city rivals Excelsior Rotterdam in 2001 to become a regular with them. After 4 seasons he transferred to VVV-Venlo. On July 1, 2007, he joined Sparta Rotterdam to become their reserve goalkeeper behind Harald Wapenaar, but he became third in the pecking order after the arrival of Sander Westerveld due to injury of Wapenaar.

International career
Varkevisser played for Netherlands U-21.

External links
 Voetbal International profile 

1982 births
Living people
Dutch footballers
Excelsior Rotterdam players
VVV-Venlo players
Sparta Rotterdam players
SC Telstar players
Eredivisie players
Eerste Divisie players
Association football goalkeepers
Footballers from Leiden